Athymhormia is a disorder of motivation, one of that class of neuro-psychiatric conditions marked by abnormalities or deficiencies in motivation. Symptoms include the loss or reduction of desire and interest toward previous motivations, loss of drive and the desire for satisfaction, curiosity, the loss of tastes and preferences, and flat affect. In athymhormia, however, these phenomena are not accompanied by the characterizing features of depression nor by any notable abnormality in intellectual or cognitive function.

Origin of diagnostic category
The diagnostic category was coined in 1922 by the French psychiatrists Dide and Guiraud, originally in reference to the behavior identified in some patients with schizophrenia.

Cause
The cause of this condition has been hypothesized to derive from abnormalities in the limbic frontal cortex, the striatum, globus pallidus, and dorso-medial thalamic nucleus. In the context of the theory of those who propose the existence of a distinct neural pathway for mood and interest, or the "hormothymic" system, athymhormia may be a disorder of this system.

See also
 Aboulia
 Amotivational syndrome
 Anhedonia
 Athymhormic syndrome
 Avolition

References

Further reading
  Patrick Verstichel and Pascale Larrouy. "Drowning Mr. M." Scientific American Mind. April 2005.

External links

Neuropsychology
Symptoms and signs of mental disorders